Electric Digger Dandy is the third solo studio album by Australian singer/songwriter James Reyne released in June 1991. The album was released in the United States as Any Day Above Ground. The album peaked at number 3 on the ARIA Charts and remains Reyne's highest-charting album.

The album saw Reyne's return to a more electric sound. It features the singles "Slave", "Any Day Above Ground" and "Some People", as well as a new, acoustic rendition of the Australian Crawl song "Reckless".

Reception
Tomas Mureika of AllMusic wrote that on "Electric Digger Dandy Reyne expanded his musical boundaries with collaborations with Jim Vallance and Tony Joe White. The result is an invigorated Reyne, who seems to be having a great time winding his voice around gorgeous melodies and intense rants alike. Despite its nutty had-to-be-changed-for-America title, Digger Dandy finds a more introspective experimental Reyne, one content to play the music at a lower level and let his words and stiletto voice speak for itself."

Track listing
"Some People" (J. Reyne, J. Vallance) – 4:13
"Slave" (J. Reyne, J. Vallance) – 4:13
"Reckless" (J. Reyne) – 5:19
"Any Day Above Ground" (J. Reyne) – 3:38
"Take a Giant Step" (J. Reyne, S. Hussey) – 5:10
"Company of Strangers" (J. Reyne, S. Hussey) – 4:05
"Black and Blue World" (J. Reyne, B. Goldsmith) – 4:06
"Stood Up" (J. Hiatt) – 4:52
"Outback Woman" (J. Reyne, T. J. White) – 3:38
"Water, Water" (J. Reyne) – 5:40
"Lay Your Weary Head Down" (J. Reyne) – 2:34

Personnel
 James Reyne – vocals, guitar
 Jef Scott – guitars, bass, vocals
 Simon Hussey – keyboards, producer
 John Watson – drums

Guests
 Mick O'Connor – Hammond organ
 Renee Geyer – backing vocals
 Gene Black – guitar
 C. J. Vanston – keyboards
 Scott Griffiths – piano, Hammon Organ, keyboards
 Steve Housden – guitar solo on "Slave"
 Richard Pleasance – mandolin
 Brett Kingman – electric guitar
 Mark Goldenberg – guitars, keyboards
 Kenny Aronoff – drums, percussion
 Jimmie Wood – harmonica
 Eric Lowen – backing vocals, acoustic guitar
 Dan Navarro – backing vocals, acoustic guitar
 Tony Joe White – electric guitar, harmonica, bass, drums
 John Pierce – bass
 Byron Berline – fiddle
 Jim McMains – backing vocals

Charts

Weekly charts

Year-end charts

Certifications

References

1991 albums
Charisma Records albums
James Reyne albums